"Nu Flow" is the debut single of British R&B collective Big Brovaz. It was released as the first single from their debut album, Nu-Flow (2002), on 14 October 2002. "Nu Flow" peaked at number three on the UK Singles Chart and spent 19 weeks inside the UK top 100. The single was also successful in New Zealand and Norway, where it reached number one, and in Australia, where it peaked at number three to become their joint highest-peaking hit with "Favourite Things".

Music video
The accompanying music video was directed by Vaughan Arnell.

Track listings

UK CD1
 "Nu Flow" (original clean radio edit)
 "Nu Flow" (Blacksmith club rub)
 "Nu Flow" (Shy FX and T Power remix)
 "Nu Flow" (video)

UK CD2
 "Nu Flow" (original)
 "Nu Flow" (Marley Marl main mix)
 "Nu Flow" (Fusion remix)

UK 12-inch single
A1. "Nu Flow" (Blacksmith club rub)
A2. "Nu Flow" (original)
B1. "Nu Flow" (Fusion remix)
B2. "Nu Flow" (Marley Marl main mix)

UK cassette single
 "Nu Flow" (original clean radio edit)
 "Nu Flow" (Marley Marl main mix)

European CD single
 "Nu Flow" (original clean radio edit)
 "Nu Flow" (Blacksmith club rub)

Australian CD single
 "Nu Flow" (clean radio edit)
 "Nu Flow" (Marley Marl main mix)
 "Nu Flow" (Shy FX & T Power remix)
 "Nu Flow" (Blacksmith club rub)

Credits and personnel
Credits are taken from the UK CD1 liner notes.

Studio
 Recorded at Dairy Studios (Brixton, England)

Personnel

 Michael Mugiisha – writing
 John Paul Horsley – writing
 Tayo Aisida – writing
 Cherise Roberts – writing
 Nadia Shepherd – writing
 Dion Howell – writing
 Dean Macintosh – writing
 Abdul Bella – writing
 Michael Brown – writing
 Big Brovaz – vocals
 Skillz and Fingaz – production
 Roy Merchant – mixing

Charts

Weekly charts

Year-end charts

Certifications

Release history

References

2002 songs
2002 debut singles
Big Brovaz songs
Daylight Records singles
Epic Records singles
Music videos directed by Vaughan Arnell
Number-one singles in New Zealand
Number-one singles in Norway